Dorstenia choconiana is a plant species in the family Moraceae which is native to Central America from Guatemala to Panama.

References

choconiana
Plants described in 1887
Flora of Guatemala
Flora of Honduras
Flora of Nicaragua
Flora of Costa Rica
Flora of Panama